Jefes de Ciudad Juárez (English: Ciudad Juárez Chiefs) are an American football team based in Chihuahua, Mexico. The Jefes compete in the Liga de Fútbol Americano Profesional (LFA), the top American football league in Mexico, after playing its inaugural season in the Fútbol Americano de México league. The team plays its home games at the Estadio 20 de Noviembre, with a capacity of 5,000 seated spectators.

History
On 18 March 2022, the team was presented at a press conference in Ciudad Juárez as an expansion team in the Fútbol Americano de México (FAM) league, with César Durán as the owner and president and David Silva as its first head coach. The inaugural 48-man roster was revealed the following month and included 16 foreign players, all with NCAA Division I or Division II experience.

The Jefes played their first game on 30 April 2022, kicking off the 2022 season with an 18–0 victory over the Bulldogs de Naucalpan at the Estadio Jaime Labastida. Andre Dowdell caught the first touchdown in team history from quarterback Andrés Chío in their first drive. The following week, the Jefes lost 18–16 to the Rojos CDMX in their home opener. After another loss in week 3, the team fired head coach David Silva and promoted linebackers coach Mario Diaz to the position. The Jefes finished their inaugural season with a 3–5 record, failing to qualify for the playoffs.

League change
On 30 September 2022, the FAM league announced it was shutting down operations, leaving the Jefes without a league. In October, the team announced it was joining the Liga de Fútbol Americano Profesional (LFA) for its upcoming season with Lorenzo Gathers as the new head coach. He became the first non-Mexican coach in LFA history.

Roster

Season-by-season

References

External links
 

Liga de Fútbol Americano Profesional teams
Sports teams in Ciudad Juárez
American football teams established in 2022
2022 establishments in Mexico